Reinhold Wosab (born February 25, 1938 in Marl, North Rhine-Westphalia) is a retired German football player. He spent 10 seasons in the Bundesliga with Borussia Dortmund and VfL Bochum.

Career

Statistics

1 1962–63 includes the West German football championships.

Honours
UEFA Cup Winners' Cup winner: 1965–66.
West German football championship winner: 1963.
Bundesliga runner-up: 1965–66.
DFB-Pokal winner: 1964–65.
DFB-Pokal finalist: 1962–63.

External links
 

1938 births
Living people
People from Marl, North Rhine-Westphalia
Sportspeople from Münster (region)
German footballers
Bundesliga players
Borussia Dortmund players
VfL Bochum players
Association football midfielders
Footballers from North Rhine-Westphalia